Flint is a small unincorporated community located west of Angola in Jackson Township, Steuben County, in the U.S. state of Indiana.

History
A post office was established at Flint in 1850, and remained in operation until it was discontinued in 1907.

Geography

Notable people
 Alonzo M. Clark, Governor of Wyoming from 1931 to 1933.

References

 Hometown Locator

Unincorporated communities in Indiana
Unincorporated communities in Steuben County, Indiana